The National Inventors Hall of Fame (NIHF) inductees includes over 600 inventors spanning three centuries of lifetimes. John Fitch was the earliest born inventor inducted into the NIHF (1743), while Barrett Comiskey is currently the most recently born (1975).

Key

Inductees

References

External links
 The official website of the National Inventors Hall of Fame

Awards established in 1973
Lists of inventors